San Luis is a populated place situated in Pima County, Arizona, United States. It is one of two locations in Pima County with this name.

References

Populated places in Pima County, Arizona